The 2006 Oceania Youth Athletics Championships were held at the Apia Park in Apia, Samoa, between December 13–16, 2006. They were held together with the 2006 Oceania Open Championships. A total of 37 events were contested, 19 by boys and 18 by girls.

Medal summary
Complete results can be found on the webpages of the Oceania Athletics Association, of Athletics PNG, of Athletics Samoa. and of the World Junior Athletics History.

Boys under 18 (Youth)

Girls under 18 (Youth)

Mixed

Medal table (unofficial)

Participation (unofficial)
An unofficial count yields the number of about 148 athletes from 19 countries:

 (5)
 (20)
 (4)
 (5)
 (7)
 (3)
 (5)
 (3)
 (1)
 (6)
 (3)
 (24)
 (2)
 (7)
 (5)
 (4)
 (24)
 (7)
 (13)

References

Oceania Youth Athletics Championships
Athletics in Samoa
Oceanian U18 Championships
2006 in Samoan sport
International sports competitions hosted by Samoa
2006 in youth sport
December 2006 sports events in Oceania